Sergiy Korsunsky (born August 10, 1962 in Kyiv, Ukrainian SSR) is a Ukrainian diplomat. He previously served as Chargé d'affaires of Ukraine to the United States during 2005 and Ambassador Extraordinary and Plenipotentiary of Ukraine to Turkey (2008-2016). Director of the Hennadii Udovenko Diplomatic Academy of Ukraine in 2017-2020.

Ambassador of Ukraine to Japan (since April 2020).

Education 
Sergiy Korsunsky graduated from Taras Shevchenko National University of Kyiv in 1984, faculty for Mathematics and Mechanics. Doctor of Science (Physics and Mathematics).

In 1995 professional training course at the Institute for International Relations, Kyiv State University

Career 
1984 — 1988 — Researcher with the National Academy of Sciences of Ukraine.

1988 — 1991 — Researcher-Consultant, Presidium of the National Academy of Sciences of Ukraine

1991 — 1994 — Director-General of the Department for State Scientific and Technological Programs at the State Committee on Science and Technologies of Ukraine

1994 — 1995 — Secretary of the first class of the Ukraine’s National Commission for UNESCO

1995 — 1998 — Counsellor for Economy, Science and Technologies, Embassy of Ukraine to the State of Israel

1998 — 2000 — Deputy Head of the Department for Economic Cooperation of the Ministry of Foreign Affairs of Ukraine

2000 — 2006 — Counsellor, Minister Counsellor of the Embassy of Ukraine, Washington, D.C., in 2005 charge d' Affairs a.i. of Ukraine to the United States.

2006 — 2008 — Head of the Department for Economic Cooperation, Ministry of Foreign Affairs of Ukraine

July 2008 — up to June 18, 2016 — Ambassador Extraordinary and Plenipotentiary of Ukraine to the Republic of Turkey

October 2017 – April 2020 - Director, Hennadii Udovenko Diplomatic Academy of Ukraine

Since 14.04.2020 - Ambassador Extraordinary and Plenipotentiary of Ukraine to Japan

Academic affiliations 

Visiting professor Kobe Gakuin University, Japan

Honorary professor Borys Grinchenko Kyiv University, Ukraine

Author publications 
Author of more than 350 academic papers and other publications including 7 books, among them "Nonlinear waves in dispersive and dissipative systems with coupled fields" (Addison, Wesley. Longman, 1997), “Technology Transfer in the United States” (Kyiv, 2005), “Energy Diplomacy” (Kyiv, 2008), "Foreign Policy in Times of Transformations: how not to be left on the sidelines of history"(Kharkiv, 2020), How to build relations with Asian countries: economy, diplomacy, cultural peculiarities (Kharkiv, 2021).

Author of 10 books of fiction published in 2010-2019 under the pen-name Sergey Vladich (in Russian), as hobby

References

External links
 AMBASSADOR OF UKRAINE DR. SERGIY KORSUNSKY’S VISIT
 Embassy of Ukraine in the Republic of Turkey
 An Interview with Mr. Sergiy Korsunsky, Ukrainian Ambassador to Turkey
 Ambassador Korsunsky: Ukraine moving to LNG to diversify supply
 Ukrainian ambassador: Time a very good warrior on our side
 Ukrainian Ambassador to Turkey Sergiy Korsunsky tells SES Türkiye that Ankara's support has been "continuous and adequate."
 Ukrainian envoy: Captive OSCE observers expected to be freed

Living people
1962 births
Diplomats from Kyiv
Taras Shevchenko National University of Kyiv alumni
Ambassadors of Ukraine to the United States
Ambassadors of Ukraine to Turkey
Ambassadors of Ukraine to Japan